Calzini is an Italian surname. Notable people with the surname include:

Brian Calzini (born 1985), American metalcore vocalist
Raffaele Calzini (1885–1953), Italian art critic and writer

See also
Caldini

Italian-language surnames